Garry Smith is a New Zealand rugby league footballer who played in the 1960s and 1970s who played for New Zealand in the 1968 and 1970 World Cups, as a , or .

Playing career
Smith originally played for the Runanga club on the West Coast, representing the West Coast.

Following a failed transfer to Sydney, Smith joined Marist in the Wellington Rugby League competition. He won premierships with the club in 1965 and 1971. For the 1971 premiership, Smith was also the club's captain-coach.

Representative career
Having already played for the West Coast, Smith became a Wellington representative when he moved to Marist.

In 1965 Smith was selected for the North Island rugby league team and the following year he was first selected for the New Zealand national rugby league team, playing in two losses to Australia. In 1967 he toured Australia, playing in only one test but ten of the seventeen tour games. He played in the 1968 World Cup in Australia and New Zealand and in the 1970 World Cup in Great Britain. In his final season for New Zealand, Smith was a key part of the Grand Slam Kiwis, playing in all seven tests as New Zealand defeated Australia 24-3 and won three-test series against Great Britain 2-1 and France 2 wins and a draw. He finished his career having played in a total of sixteen tests for New Zealand and thirty nine games.

References

Living people
New Zealand national rugby league team players
New Zealand rugby league players
Place of birth missing (living people)
Rugby league props
Rugby league second-rows
Wellington rugby league team players
Year of birth missing (living people)
West Coast rugby league team players
Runanga players
North Island rugby league team players
New Zealand rugby league coaches